Kristie Lynn Greene (born July 24, 1970) is an American beauty pageant titleholder from Greenville, South Carolina who was named Miss South Carolina 1994.

Biography
She competed at the Miss America 1995 competition, won by Miss Alabama, Heather Whitestone. Greene is a graduate of Clemson University with a degree in Secondary Education. Since 2009, she has served as guest emcee for the Miss South Carolina pageant in Spartanburg, South Carolina. She married John E. Lee of Florence, SC in 2006. Together they have a daughter, Anna-Davis Lee.

References

External links
 
 

1970 births
Living people
American beauty pageant winners
Clemson University alumni
Miss America 1995 delegates
People from Anderson, South Carolina
People from Greenville, South Carolina
20th-century American people